The 45th Arizona State Legislature, consisting of the Arizona State Senate and the Arizona House of Representatives, was constituted in Phoenix from January 1, 2001, to December 31, 2002, during the final two years of Jane Dee Hull's first full term in office. Both the Senate and the House membership remained constant at 30 and 60, respectively. The Republicans lost a seat in the Senate, creating a 15-15 balance with the Democrats. The Republicans lost four seats in the House, maintaining their majority in the lower chamber, 36–24.

Sessions
The Legislature met for two regular sessions at the State Capitol in Phoenix. The first opened on January 8, 2001, and adjourned on May 10, while the Second Regular Session convened on January 14, 2002, and adjourned sine die on May 23.

There were six Special Sessions, the first of which was convened on September 24, 2001, and adjourned on September 26; the second convened on November 13, 2001, and adjourned sine die on December 19; the third convened on February 4, 2002, and adjourned sine die March 20; the fourth convened on April 1, 2002, and adjourned sine die on May 23; the fifth convened on July 30, 2002, and adjourned sine die August 1; the sixth and final special session convened and adjourned on November 25, 2002.

State Senate

Members

The asterisk (*) denotes members of the previous Legislature who continued in office as members of this Legislature.

House of Representatives

Members 
The asterisk (*) denotes members of the previous Legislature who continued in office as members of this Legislature.

References

Arizona legislative sessions
2001 in Arizona
2002 in Arizona
2001 U.S. legislative sessions
2002 U.S. legislative sessions